Japie Kleinhans is a South African rugby union player for the  in the Currie Cup. His regular position is centre, wing or fullback.

Kleinhans was named in the  squad for the Super Rugby Unlocked and 2020 Currie Cup Premier Division competitions.

References

South African rugby union players
Living people
Rugby union centres
Rugby union wings
Rugby union fullbacks
Pumas (Currie Cup) players
Year of birth missing (living people)
Leopards (rugby union) players